Echinodorus palifolius, also known as Mexican sword plant is an emerged aquatic plant in the  Alismataceae. It has a rather odd, discontinuous range, native to Brazil (Minas Gerais and Bahia), Peru, Uruguay, and Mexico (Nayarit). It has been introduced in many countries including Bangladesh and India.

The specific epithet is sometimes spelled "palaefolius." The correct spelling is "palifolius" per ICN 60G.1.

Gallery

References

External links
All Things Plant, photo of Mexican sword plant
 
 
Aquaportail

palifolius
Freshwater plants
Plants described in 1823
Flora of Mexico
Flora of Nayarit
Flora of Brazil
Flora of Peru
Flora of Uruguay